People's Memorial Cemetery, formerly known as Providence Cemetery, is a historic African-American cemetery located at Petersburg, Virginia. The cemetery was deeded in three sections: the first tract in 1840, the second tract was added in 1865, and the final acres were deeded about 1880.  The cemetery reflects the organization of "free persons of color" and is evidence of the evolution of the entrepreneurial efforts of African-American undertakers and stonecutters; the activities of mutual aid societies; and the community's social, religious, and artistic values from 1840 to 1942.

It was listed on the National Register of Historic Places in 2008.

The cemetery is located adjacent to the Blandford Cemetery and portions of the grounds were part of the Negro Burying Ground, a cemetery for slaves that died during the War of 1812.

References

Cemeteries on the National Register of Historic Places in Virginia
African-American history of Virginia
Petersburg, Virginia
National Register of Historic Places in Petersburg, Virginia